The 2021-22 Ukrainian championship in football season was the 26th since it replaced the competition of physical culture clubs.

On 11 August 2020, the AAFU published information about the upcoming season with a tentative composition. The championship started on the 7th of August 2021. Since the Russo-Ukrainian War grew in its intensity, the competition ended early during its winter recession. No title was awarded.

Teams

Relegated professional clubs 
 None

Returning/reformed clubs 
 Prykarpattia-Teplovyk Ivano-Frankivsk (returning, last played season in 2016 as its main team Teplovyk Ivano-Frankivsk)
 Mayak Sarny (returning, last played season in 2014)
 Zviahel Novohrad-Volynskyi (debuting, another club FC Zvyahel-750 Novohrad-Volynskyi last played season in 2010)
 Nyva Buzova (debuting, another club Hran Buzova last played season in 2006)
 Naftovyk Okhtyrka (returning, last played season in 2003 as its reserve Naftovyk-2 Okhtyrka)
 Lokomotyv Kyiv (returning, last played season in 1981; late start)

 Debut  
List of teams that are debuting this season in the league:

 Feniks Pidmonastyr
 Urahan Cherniiv
 OFKIP (Piddubny Olympic College)

 VAST Mykolaiv
 Olimp Kamianske
 OSDYuShOR-FC Zaporizhia

 Khliborob Nyzhni Torhayi
  Kyiv (late start)

Withdrawn teams
List of clubs that took part in last year competition, but chose not to participate in 2021–22 season:

 Votrans Lutsk
 Varatyk Kolomyia

 MFC Pervomaisk
 Kryvbas-2 Kryvyi Rih

 Borysfen Dnipro

Clubs that did not play last season in the league, but showed interest at first yet withdrew before the start of the season:
 FC Sambir

 Location map 
The following displays the location of teams. 

Stadiums
Group A
Group B
Group CNotes: Reg — regional championship (Regions of Ukraine)
 Am[#] — AAFU championship where sign (#) indicates Group number

Group stage
Group 1NotesGroup 2NotesGroup 3Notes''

Final stage
To the stage qualify eight teams, selection of which is determined exclusively by the AAFU Commission in conducting competitions. Both stages quarterfinals and semifinals consist of two legs (home and away). The final game is scheduled to take place at neutral field. The stage was canceled as competition ended early.

Promotions to the Second League
The amateur teams are allowed to participate in the Ukrainian championship among teams of the 2022–23 Ukrainian Second League under such conditions:
 Team participated in the Ukrainian championship among amateur teams throughout the 2021–22 season and was a participant of the championship play-off stage.
 The club received a license in accordance to the Regulation on licensing of football clubs of the Ukrainian Second League.
 The club and its results of participation in the AAFU competitions meet the requirements that are defined in regulations of the All-Ukrainian competitions in football among clubs' teams of the 2021–22 Professional Football League of Ukraine.

See also
 2021-22 Ukrainian Amateur Cup
 2021-22 Ukrainian Second League
 2021-22 Ukrainian First League
 2021-22 Ukrainian Premier League

Notes

References

External links
AAFU
The 2021–22 season's regulations. AAFU.
Аматори, на старт! Прев’ю чемпіонату ААФУ 2021/22. Sport Arena. 7 August 2021

Ukrainian Football Amateur League seasons
Amateur
Ukraine
Sports events affected by the 2022 Russian invasion of Ukraine